Quo Vadis? is a 1985 international television miniseries made by Radiotelevisione Italiana, Antenne 2, Polyphon Film- und Fernsehgesellschaft, Channel 4 Television, Televisión Española and Televisione Svizzera Italiana (TSI). It was directed by Franco Rossi and produced by Elio Scardamaglia and Francesco Scardamaglia. The script was by Ennio De Concini based on the 1896 novel Quo Vadis by Henryk Sienkiewicz.

The series lasts six hours and was originally shown in six one-hour episodes.

Plot summary

Cast
 Klaus Maria Brandauer as Nero 
 Frederic Forrest as Petronius
 Cristina Raines as Poppaea
 Barbara De Rossi as Eunice
 Francesco Quinn as Marcus Vinicius
 Max von Sydow as The Apostle Peter
 Marie-Theres Relin as Licya 
 Gabriele Ferzetti as Piso 
 Ángela Molina as Acte 
 Massimo Girotti as Aulus Plauzius
 Françoise Fabian as Pomponia
 Philippe Leroy as Paul of Tarsus 
 Leopoldo Trieste as Chilo 
 Olga Karlatos as Epicaris
 Marko Nikolic as  Tigellinus
 Georges Wilson as Pedanius
 Marisa Solinas as Polybia 
 Annie Belle as Myriam
 Valerija Brkljač as Epafrodito
 Radomir Kovačević as Ursus

References

External links
 
 

Quo Vadis?
Films based on works by Henryk Sienkiewicz
Films directed by Franco Rossi
Films set in classical antiquity
Television dramas set in ancient Rome
Italian drama films
Italian television miniseries
Depictions of Nero on television
Cultural depictions of Poppaea Sabina
Cultural depictions of Saint Peter
Cultural depictions of Paul the Apostle
Television series set in the 1st century
1980s Italian films